Rev-Raptor is the 13th studio album by German heavy metal band U.D.O., released on 20 May 2011 via AFM Records. It is the final album to feature Stefan Kaufmann and Igor Gianola.

Track listing

Personnel 
 Udo Dirkschneider: vocals
 Stefan Kaufmann: guitar
 Igor Gianola: guitar
 Fitty Wienhold: bass
 Francesco Jovino: drums

References 

U.D.O. albums
2011 albums
AFM Records albums